Agdistis pseudocanariensis is a moth in the family Pterophoridae. It is known from Spain and the Canary Islands.

The wingspan is 14–17 mm. The forewings are grey.

References

Agdistinae
Moths described in 1973